Godot may refer to:

 Godot, the eponymous character in the play Waiting for Godot
 Godot (band), an English synthpop band formed in the 1980s
 Buck Godot, a science fiction comic book series, and its title character
 Godot (Ace Attorney), a character from the video game Phoenix Wright: Ace Attorney - Trials and Tribulations
 Godot (game engine), an open-source game engine
 Godot, the first TBM for Elon Musk's The Boring Company

See also
 
 Gadot, a kibbutz in northern Israel
 Gadot (surname)
 Godet (disambiguation)